"Listen Like Thieves" is the title song and fourth and final single from Australian rock band INXS's fifth album, Listen Like Thieves. The B-side to the single was "Different World", which appeared on the "Crocodile" Dundee soundtrack. It was released a single during 1986, where it peaked at number 46. The track first appeared on the album which was released in October 1985.

Cash Box called it "a grooving, biting rock gem."  Billboard called it "crisp arena rock."

Charts

Cover versions
Was (Not Was) covered the song and released it as a single in 1992 to promote their album Hello Dad ... I'm in Jail. It reached number 58 on the UK Singles Chart.

References

1986 singles
1992 singles
ARIA Award-winning songs
INXS songs
Was (Not Was) songs
Songs written by Andrew Farriss
Songs written by Michael Hutchence
Song recordings produced by Chris Thomas (record producer)
1985 songs
Atlantic Records singles
Songs written by Garry Gary Beers
Songs written by Jon Farriss
Songs written by Tim Farriss
Songs written by Kirk Pengilly